Tørres Christensen (10 May 1664 – 15 February 1721) was a Norwegian timber merchant, sawmill owner, landowner and ship owner.

He was born at the village of Nedenes in Øyestad (now Arendal) in Aust-Agder, Norway. He attended the Bergen Cathedral School.  By 1682,  he was enrolled as skipper  in the service of the  Danish King. He settled in Mandal in  Vest-Agder during 1687, where he married Karen Mortensdatter Als (1666-1743), daughter of Morten Mortensen Als(d. 1691), the leading merchant of the town.

After the death of his father-in-law in 1691, Christensen took over the business and became the dominant merchant in Mandal.  He greatly expanded by establishing himself as a merchant and shipowner in Kristiansand. During the Great Northern War (1700-1721), he controlled large parts of the timber trade from the valley of Mandalen. He also continued in a few more years to sail as skipper on his own ships. As the dominant employer, merchant, creditor and landowner in Mandal, he ran the small town almost like a business. Christensen owned property both in Mandal and Kristiansand. He held several farms,  several with salmon fishing rights, including Halshaug gård in Vest-Agder which was located at the mouth of river Mandalselva.

References

Other sources
Syrdahl, Arvid (1998)  Kongen av Mandal (MediaFoto A.S., Mandal) 

1664 births
1721 deaths
People from Arendal
 People educated at the Bergen Cathedral School
Norwegian businesspeople in shipping
Norwegian businesspeople in timber
Norwegian landowners
Norwegian merchants
Norwegian sailors
Norwegian fishers
17th-century Norwegian businesspeople
18th-century Norwegian businesspeople